Neches may refer to:

Neches River, a river in Texas
Neches, Texas, an unincorporated community in Anderson County, Texas
Neches High School, a public high school in Neches, Texas